The 1877 season was the first in which Geelong participated in the newly established Victorian Football Association. Geelong did not have a captain this season nor did they have a best and fairest. No data is available as to who scored the most goals. Geelong did not play enough matches to place on the ladder.

Season Summary 
Geelong mainly played matches against local teams this season with only three matches against senior clubs. Of those matches, Geelong won one match and lost two matches. Geelong played twice against Geelong Imperial winning one match and drawing the other. Geelong also played matches against Camperdown and Colac, and Victorian Railways, winning both of these matches.

Results

References 

 Geelong Football Club seasons
 1877 in Australian rules football